The Centre Party (C) is a liberal political party in Sweden, founded in 1913.

The party's major issues are the national economy, the environment, political decentralisation and social integration. It is represented in all of the Riksdag's parliamentary committees, currently holding 31 seats. From 2019 to 2021, it provided confidence and supply to the Löfven II Cabinet.

Traditionally part of the Nordic agrarian party family, the Centre Party has increasingly shifted its focus towards economic liberalism, environmental protection, equality of the sexes and decentralisation of governmental authority. The party self-describes as liberal feminist, campaigning for policies which enhance gender equality on an individualist basis. Its environmental policies stress the importance of consent and voluntary action, including working with foresters and private landowners to promote biodiversity within a mutually agreeable framework.

The Centre Party has held the position of Prime Minister of Sweden three times, most recently Thorbjörn Fälldin who held the post for a total of 5 years, from 1976 to 1978 and then again from 1979 to 1982. It is a member of the Alliance of Liberals and Democrats for Europe, the Liberal International and Renew Europe. It was originally named Farmers' League (B).

History 

The party was founded in 1913 as the Farmers' League (B). At that time, it had been the closest ally of the centre-left Swedish Social Democratic Party for twenty-five years and its coalition partners between 1936 and 1945 as well as between 1951 and 1957. However, it has since revised this strategy in order to establish a closer long-term alliance between the centre-right borgerlig ("bourgeois" or "nonsocialist") parties that achieved power between 1976 and 1982 and between 1991 and 1994.

Thorbjörn Fälldin was the leader of the Centre Party and Prime Minister from 1976 until 1982, except a short interregnum in 1978–1979 by the Liberal People's Party leader Ola Ullsten. The Centre Party again joined a centre-right government following the 1991 general election led by Moderate Party leader Carl Bildt. During the leaderships of Maud Olofsson and Annie Lööf in the 2000s, the party positioned itself clearly on the political right as a small business-friendly party, leaning towards neoliberal and right-libertarian policies and viewing the Social Democrats as its main opponent.

In 2005, the Centre Party sold its ownership of the newspaper group Centertidningar AB for 1.8 billion SEK, making it the richest political party in the world at the time. In 2022, Annie Lööf resigned as the leader of the Centre Party.

2006 general election 

The 2006 Swedish general election was a success for the Centre Party. Its support had been slowly increasing through recent elections, receiving 5.1% of the votes in 1998 and increasing this to 6.2% in 2002. In the 2006 Swedish general election, 7.88% of the vote went to the Centre Party, entitling the party to 29 of the 349 seats in the Riksdag. Furthermore, their alliance with the other parties in the Alliance for Sweden, a centre-right coalition which won a majority of parliament seats in this election, meant that the Centre Party shared the ministry posts with their Alliance for Sweden allies, namely the Moderate Party, the Liberal People's Party and the Christian Democrats. The strong victory by the Centre Party has been studied by political scientist Lina M. Eriksson, who in her dissertation from the Department of Government at Uppsala University, entitled "Natural Disasters and National Election", performs a rigorous statistical analysis of election data combined with interviews with Maud Olofsson, Eskil Erlandsson, Ulrica Messing and Mona Sahlin. Eriksson's research finds that both the Indian Ocean's 2004 Boxing Day Tsunami and the 2005 Cyclone Gudrun (Erwin) which struck only two weeks following the tsunami are major events that impacted government popularity in the general election and contributed to the redistribution of voter support within and across party-blocs, with particularly interesting results for the Centre Party. According to this research, "[t]he core findings from this thesis show that the Swedish Social Democratic Party (S) government's poor crisis response to Gudrun, which is the hitherto most costly natural disaster in Swedish history, alone has an estimated effect of a magnitude that likely contributed to the 2006 historic regime shift, while the tsunami also seems to have mattered. The tsunami is particularly interesting, as S's poor international crisis response to the event constitutes the first natural disaster situation to knowingly have affected an election on the other side of the planet. Moreover, to some degree voters recognized the active opposition by C as effective representation and rewarded the party for its strong stance on the poor handling of both events by S. In fact, the active voice of C concerning these disasters likely helped move the party from the periphery of party politics to becoming the third-largest party in Swedish politics". Part of the dissertation has been published in Electoral Studies which is to be considered the leading scientific journal in election research. In the article, long-term effects are also found over the 2010 and 2014 Swedish general elections, implying that the Cyclone Gudrun in particular triggered long-lasting changes in voter support from the left to the right side of the political spectrum. A comprehensive summary of the dissertation is available for download via Uppsala University.

Ideology and political position 
The Centre Party has been also described as social-liberal, economically liberal, and "ecological-liberal". It describes itself as a green-liberal and libertarian party, while it has traditionally associated with agrarianism and the Nordic agrarian ideology.

National economy 
The party has been described as one of Sweden's most market liberal parties in liberal, socialist and conservative media. However, the party describes itself as "a party with a green, social and decentralised liberalism". The party leadership has advocated neoliberalism and right-libertarianism. The party advocates lower taxes, greatly reduced employer contributions, a freer market and an increased RUT-deduction. The party is a big advocator for small-business, farmers and entrepreneurs. They also want to invest in the infrastructure and transportation so that employees could work in bigger cities but still live in the rural areas and vice versa. On economic policy, they view the Social Democrats and the Sweden Democrats as their opponents, though they have been supporting a government of the Social Democrats since 2018.

Immigration 
The party is liberal on immigration, seeking to combine generous immigration policy with an initially more restrictive contribution policy to the immigrants. After the European migrant crisis, the party proposed to replace the existing establishment grants with establishment loans, similar to the Swedish student loans.

The balance of the state responsibility of accepting refugees with their responsibility for integration into Swedish society is at the core of the party policy. In January 2016, the party for example proposed to give all immigrants compulsory civic education in both rights and expectations from the society.

European Union 
The party is a decentralist pro-European party that believes that the European Union is an important union to secure peace, freedom and trade between the European countries. The party also advocates a smaller but sharper European Union that focuses on democracy and peace, free movement and trade, vigorous action against climate change and collaboration against organized crime while also believing that Sweden should stay outside the monetary union and keep the krona as the currency.

The party is a member of the ALDE and its European Parliament group Renew Europe. MEP Fredrick Federley is a vice-president of the ALDE Party and the group leader of the ALDE group in the European Parliament Committee on Industry, Research and Energy.

In the European Committee of the Regions, the Center Party sits in the Renew Europe CoR group with one full and one alternate member for the 2020-2025 mandate.

Publications 
The Centre Party owned a media consortium called Centertidningar AB. It included newspapers that the party had either started on their own or brought from competitors. It included Hallands Nyheter, Södermanlands Nyheter, Länstidningen i Södertälje, Nynäshamns Posten, Norrtelje Tidning, Lidingö Tidning, Ljusdalsposten, Östersunds-Posten, Hälsingekuriren and Hudiksvalls Tidning. The consortium was split in 2005 and sold to Mittmedia, Stampen Group and VLT for a total of 1.815 billion Swedish kronor.

Electoral results

Riksdag

European Parliament

Voter base 

Traditionally, most of the party's voters come from rural areas and include farmers and agricultural producers. Since the takeover of Maud Olofsson in recent years, the party has been attracting liberal voters from urban areas in central Sweden. It is believed that voters from the Liberals have been moving to the Centre Party due to changes in both parties.

Leaders of the Centre Party 
The Leader of the Centre Party is its highest political and organisational officer, its president in the National Executive Board and representative of the party in the media, in public and with other parties. The party leader has often held an important cabinet portfolio when the party has been part of a coalition.

Current Members of Parliament 
Current Members of Parliament include:
 Daniel Bäckström, spokesperson on defence
 Ulrika Carlsson, deputy leader in the Riksdag and spokesperson on educational affairs
 Fredrik Christensson, spokesperson on youth employment and higher education
 Staffan Danielsson
 Eskil Erlandsson, spokesperson on agriculture and farming
 Johan Hedin, spokesperson on justice and law
 Peter Helander, spokesperson on regional affairs
 Ola Johansson, spokesperson on housing and building
 Per-Ingvar Johnsson, spokesperson on constitutional affairs
 Anders W. Jonsson, leader in the Riksdag and spokesperson on social affairs
 Johanna Jönsson, spokesperson on immigration and integration
 Emil Källström, spokesperson on finance and economics
 Helena Lindahl, spokesperson on business 
 Per Lodenius, spokesperson on culture and sport
 Kerstin Lundgren, spokesperson on foreign affairs and security 
 Annie Lööf, party chairman
 Rickard Nordin, spokesperson on climate and energy
 Annika Qarlsson, spokesperson on labour, employment and gender equality
 Kristina Yngwe, spokesperson on environment and food
 Solveig Zander, spokesperson on social security 
 Anders Åkesson, spokesperson on transportation and infrastructure
 Per Åsling, spokesperson on taxation

Party leadership 
The current party leadership include:
 Annie Lööf, Leader of the Centre Party
 Anders W. Jonsson, first Deputy Leader of the Centre Party and Leader in the Riksdag
 Kristina Yngwe, Member of Parliament and Spokesperson at Environment 
 Mari-Louise Wernersson, Mayor of Falkenberg Municipality
 Michael Arthursson, Secretary-General of the Centre Party

See also

References

External links 
 The Swedish Parliament: The Centre Party

1913 establishments in Sweden
Alliance of Liberals and Democrats for Europe Party member parties
Centrist parties in Sweden
Green liberalism
Liberal International
Liberal parties in Sweden
Nordic agrarian parties
Political parties established in 1913